The ten recitations or ten readings are ten Qira'ates and recitations of the Quran approved by scholars in their research to determine the frequent recitations.

History
The Quran was revealed in seven ahruf or letters, and the letters are not only in writing, but also in pronunciation, meaning, vowel, endowment signs, and brevity, and due to the different accents and dialects of the Arabs to whom the Quran was revealed.

Uthman ibn Affan compiled the Quran in one formation, and there are seven fixed recitations and three complementary readings of the seven, so the ten readings are completed, and all these readings and their pronouncements were reported by Muhammad, and were transmitted by the Sahaba, the Tabi'un, and so on.

Spread
Most of these ten recitations are known by the scholars and people who have received them, and their number is due to their spreading in the Islamic world.

However, the general population of Muslims scattered in most countries of the Islamic world, their number estimated in the millions, read Hafs's narration on the authority of Aasim.

In the countries of the Maghreb, they read by reciting Imam Nafi, who is the imam of the people of Medina, whether it is the narration of Warsh or the narration of Qalun.

In Sudan and in Hadhramaut, they read the narration that Al-Duri narrated on the authority of Abu Amr.

Presentation
When the ten recitations were scientifically stabilized, after an increase of three other readings added to the Ahruf and the recitations of the Seven readers by Imam Ibn al-Jazari, the total became ten readings, and these three added readings are the readings of these Imams:
 .
 .
 .

Recitations
The ten proven and verified recitations of the Imams Qāriʾs of the Quran are in order:
 Nafiʽ al-Madani recitation.
 Ibn Kathir al-Makki recitation.
 Abu Amr of Basra recitation.
 Ibn Amir ad-Dimashqi recitation.
 Aasim ibn Abi al-Najud recitation.
 Hamzah az-Zaiyyat recitation.
 Al-Kisa'i recitation.
  recitation.
  recitation.
  recitation.

Riwayates
There are two reading versions or riwaya for each of the ten recitations, which counts twenty confirmed riwayates:

See also
Qira'at
Ahruf
Seven readers
Ijazah

References

Quranic readings
Islamic terminology
Warsh recitation